Sergey Betov and Mikhail Elgin were the defending champions, but Betov did not participate. Elgin instead partnered Denys Molchanov. Elgin and Molchanov lost in the quarterfinals to Toshihide Matsui and Vishnu Vardhan.

Yannick Jankovits and Luca Margaroli won the title after defeating Toshihide Matsui and Vishnu Vardhan 6–4, 7–6(7–4) in the final.

Seeds

Draw

References
 Main Draw

Fergana Challenger - Doubles
2016 Men's Doubles